Cagle is an American surname resulting from the Anglicization of the German surname Kegel. Notable people with the surname include:

Alfred Marcus Cagle (1884–1968), American Shape Note composer
Brett Cagle (born 1962), American religious leader
Casey Cagle (born 1966), American politician
Chris Cagle (born 1968), American country music singer, apparent relative of football player Chris
Chris "Red" Cagle (1905–1942), American football player
Daryl Cagle (born 1956), American cartoonist
Harold Cagle (1913–1977), American Olympic athlete
Joey Allen (née Joseph Allen Cagle, born 1964), American glam metal guitarist
Mary Cagle (born 1989), American webcomic artist
Myrtle Cagle (born 1925), American pilot and part of Mercury 13
Sandy Cagle (born 1957), American model
Susan Justice (née Susan Cagle, born 1981), American pop-rock singer
Susie Cagle, American journalist/cartoonist, daughter of Daryl
Yvonne Cagle (born 1959), American astronaut

See also
Cagle's map turtle, a species of turtle
Chris Cagle, Chris Cagle's self-titled album